Birutė Nedzinskienė (4 December 1955 – 24 August 1994) was a Lithuanian politician, born in Inta, Komi ASSR. In 1990 she was among those who signed the Act of the Re-Establishment of the State of Lithuania.

References
 Biography

1955 births
1994 deaths
People from Inta
Vilnius University alumni
Women members of the Seimas
20th-century Lithuanian women politicians
20th-century Lithuanian politicians
Members of the Seimas